Connesena Creek is a stream in Bartow County, in the U.S. state of Georgia. It is a tributary to the Etowah River.

Connesena Creek was named after an individual family of Cherokees which settled near its course. The name in their native Cherokee language means "dragging canoe".

See also
List of rivers of Georgia (U.S. state)

References

Rivers of Bartow County, Georgia
Rivers of Georgia (U.S. state)